Twist is a test automation and functional testing solution built by Thoughtworks Studios, the software division of ThoughtWorks. It uses Behavior Driven Development (BDD) and Test-driven development (TDD) for functional testing of the application. It is a part of the Adaptive ALM solution  consisting of Twist for Agile testing by ThoughtWorks Studios,  Mingle for Agile project management and Go for Agile release management.

Twist is no longer supported by ThoughtWorks.

Features 
 Twist allows test specifications to be written in English or any UTF-8 supported language.
 Test implementation is done using Java or Groovy.
 Twist's IDE supports manual, automated and hybrid testing.
 Twist can be used with any Java based driver. It provides support for 
 Selenium and Sahi for testing web-based applications
 SWTBot for testing Eclipse/SWT applications
 Frankenstein for testing Java Swing applications
 Calabash for testing Android and iOS applications
 Fast Script Development
 Consolidation of redundant code (refactoring as “Concepts”)
 Type Ahead and Suggestion
 Team coding
 Version control, organization, and searching in Confluence
 Shared script libraries
 Tagging (Test/Production, Categories, etc.) with Filters
 Filter scripts based on Tags
 Run groups of tests based on Tags

References

External links 
 Twist Community

Automation software
Graphical user interface testing
2008 software